Irondro is a village in the region of Vatovavy in Madagascar. It belongs to the municipality of Antsenavolo and the district of Mananjary/ It is situated at the crossroad of the Route nationale 25  betwren Ranomafana, Ifanadiana  and Mananjary and is the startpoint of the Route nationale 12 to Manakara (118km) and Farafangana.

Mining
There are some mining operations on emeralds since the 1970th.

References

External links 
  Pictures of Irondro

Populated places in Vatovavy